Claudio Daniel Bieler (born March 1, 1984) is an Argentine footballer who plays as a forward for Atlético Rafaela.

Club career

Rise in career
In 2005 Bieler made his professional debut with Primera División Argentina squad Colón de Santa Fe. The following year he was loaned to Primera B Nacional Argentina squad Atlético Rafaela, where he led the league with sixteen goals. In 2007, he caught the eye of fellow Argentine Claudio Borghi who signed him to Colo-Colo. Bieler attained the 2007 Clausura championship in Chile with Colo Colo.

LDU Quito
At LDU Quito, he built a reputation as a very capable striker. He was an integral part of the squad that won the 2008 Copa Libertadores (where he had a goal wrongfully disallowed for offsides in the final game) and the squad that was the runner-up of the 2008 FIFA Club World Cup. He was the team's top-scorer in 2008 with 17 goals, and was the Ecuadorian Serie A's top-scorer in 2009 with 22 goals. He provided the winning goal in Liga's win in the first leg of the 2009 Recopa Sudamericana and scored one of three goals in the second leg at home. In the 2009 Copa Sudamericana, he was the tournament's top-scorer with eight goals, including two hat-tricks against Argentine team Lanús and Uruguayan team River Plate.

He scored his first hat-trick for Serie A on February 12, 2012, in the match between LDU Quito and Olmedo, where LDU Quito won 5-0. He garnered interest from Mexican clubs, although he expressed his wish to retire with Liga de Quito.

Racing Club
On January 6, 2010 Racing Club de Avellaneda signed the striker to a three-and-a half year contract with 50% of the Bieler sporting rights.

Sporting Kansas City
Bieler signed with Sporting Kansas City of Major League Soccer as a designated player on December 18, 2012. Sporting paid an undisclosed transfer fee to LDU Quito to obtain Bieler.

Bieler was released by Kansas City on January 20, 2015.

Belgrano
On 6 January 2016 Bieler signed with CA Belgrano.

International career
Due to his performance playing for LDU Quito, elements of the Ecuadorian press have suggested that Bieler should play for the Ecuador national team. When asked to comment on the remarks, he has publicly stated that he would change nationalities to play for Ecuador. On February 4, 2010, he was called up by Argentine manager Diego Maradona, but ended up not playing because of a suspected injury. In May 2010, Bieler returned to Ecuador to undergo the naturalization process. However, he is not eligible to play for the Ecuador national team.

Honours
Colo-Colo
 Primera División de Chile (1): 2007 Clausura

LDU Quito
 Copa Libertadores (1): 2008
 Recopa Sudamericana (1): 2009
 Copa Sudamericana (1): 2009

Independiente del Valle
Copa Sudamericana (1): 2019

Sporting Kansas City
 MLS Cup (1): 2013

Personal life
Bieler became a citizen of Ecuador in 2011 since he is in a free union with Ecuadoran girlfriend.

References

External links
 
 Argentine Primera statistics at Fútbol XXI  
 Claudio Bieler at BDFA.com.ar 
 
 

1984 births
Living people
Argentine footballers
Argentine expatriate footballers
Argentine emigrants to Ecuador
Naturalized citizens of Ecuador
Sportspeople from Santa Fe Province
Argentine people of German descent
Association football forwards
Argentine Primera División players
Primera Nacional players
Major League Soccer players
Ecuadorian Serie A players
Newell's Old Boys footballers
Club Atlético Colón footballers
Atlético de Rafaela footballers
Racing Club de Avellaneda footballers
Colo-Colo footballers
L.D.U. Quito footballers
Sporting Kansas City players
Quilmes Atlético Club footballers
Club Atlético Belgrano footballers
San Martín de Tucumán footballers
C.S.D. Independiente del Valle footballers
Designated Players (MLS)
Argentine expatriate sportspeople in Chile
Argentine expatriate sportspeople in Bolivia
Argentine expatriate sportspeople in Ecuador
Argentine expatriate sportspeople in the United States
Expatriate footballers in Chile
Expatriate footballers in Bolivia
Expatriate footballers in Ecuador
Expatriate soccer players in the United States